1 Samuel 28 is the twenty-eighth chapter of the First Book of Samuel in the Old Testament of the Christian Bible or the first part of the Books of Samuel in the Hebrew Bible. According to Jewish tradition the book was attributed to the prophet Samuel, with additions by the prophets Gad and Nathan, but modern scholars view it as a composition of a number of independent texts of various ages from c. 630–540 BCE. This chapter contains the account of David's escape from Saul's repeated attempts to kill him This is within a section comprising 1 Samuel 16 to 2 Samuel 5 which records the rise of David as the king of Israel.

Text
This chapter was originally written in the Hebrew language. It is divided into 25 verses.

Textual witnesses
Some early manuscripts containing the text of this chapter in Hebrew are of the Masoretic Text tradition, which includes the Codex Cairensis (895), Aleppo Codex (10th century), and Codex Leningradensis (1008). Fragments containing parts of this chapter in Hebrew were found among the Dead Sea Scrolls including 4Q51 (4QSam; 100–50 BCE) with extant verses 1–3, 22–25.

Extant ancient manuscripts of a translation into Koine Greek known as the Septuagint (originally was made in the last few centuries BCE) include Codex Vaticanus (B; B; 4th century) and Codex Alexandrinus (A; A; 5th century).

Places 

Endor
Gilboa
Shunem

The Philistines gather against Israel (28:1–2)
Verses 1–2 continue the story of David's time among the Philistines, which will be picked up again in chapters 29–30. As the Philistines prepared for another war against Israel, David was placed in an awkward position to prove his loyalty to Achish by going to fight against his own people.

Saul and the Medium of Endor (28:3–25)

At his camp at Gilboa, facing the big army of Philistines at Shunem, Saul was in utter fear because he had no access to divine guidance, as described in verses 3–6:
 Samuel was already dead and buried
 Saul had removed 'mediums and wizards' from the land, as was required by law (Leviticus 19:31; 20:6, 27; Deuteronomy 18:11). 
 Saul did not get any answer when he sought YHWH's guidance through dreams, sacred lots (Urim) and prophets (cf. Jeremiah 18:18; Ezekiel 7:26). 
This caused Saul to desperately turn to prohibited means of getting to know the divine will, going against his own laws. Because Endor was located northeast of Shunem, thus behind enemy lines, Saul had to go in disguise and at night. The narrative about Saul's visit to the woman in Endor was 'one of the most bizarre texts in Scripture', as it claimed that Samuel's spirit could be called to speak through using witchcraft. It is debatable whether it was really Samuel's spirit or the woman impersonating Samuel, because there was no new information was given other than what was already known from Samuel's speech long ago. The text does say that the woman "saw a figure coming up", whom Saul assumed to be "Samuel" (verse 14), and was in terror (as perhaps she never had this result before), as well as got the knowledge that Saul was the one requesting this (verse 12). The main point of the narrative is to show how Saul was totally cut off from YHWH, and failed as a king to protect Israel as he himself and his heirs would die at the hands of the Philistines.

Verse 3
Now Samuel had died, and all Israel had lamented for him and buried him in Ramah, in his own city. And Saul had put the mediums and the spiritists out of the land.
The first sentence is a repetition of 1 Samuel 25:1.

See also

Related Bible parts: 1 Samuel 27, 1 Samuel 29, 1 Samuel 30

Notes

References

Sources

Commentaries on Samuel

General

External links
 Jewish translations:
 Shmuel I - I Samuel - Chapter 28 (Judaica Press). Hebrew text and English translation [with Rashi's commentary] at Chabad.org
 Christian translations:
 Online Bible at GospelHall.org (ESV, KJV, Darby, American Standard Version, Bible in Basic English)
 1 Samuel chapter 28. Bible Gateway

28
Witch of Endor